Solomiac is a commune in the Gers department in southwestern France.

Geography

History 
Solomiac was founded in 1322, by the Planselve Abbey, the Cistercian monastery, which was active from 1143 until 1789 and Beraud, the Seneschal of Solomiac.

Structure
This Bastide has the typical central market square with the halle, the market building in the center of this open space.  The market building is built with stone with wooden and stone pillars on the roof. Around this area there are the typical stone houses with the arcades. At the top of the square, where is a church.

Population

See also
Communes of the Gers department

References

Communes of Gers